Resit Schuurman (born 31 March 1979) is a Dutch football manager and former professional player, who is currently the head coach of Vierde Klasse club DVV Davo. As a player, he was a defensive midfielder renowned for coupling physical power with great technique.

Playing career
Schuurman made his debut in the professional football squad of Go Ahead Eagles in the 1997–98 season. He moved to NEC in 2001, where he made his debut in the Eredivisie under manager Johan Neeskens. In the last matchday of the 2002–03 season, the team reached European football after a win in injury time against RKC Waalwijk. Schuurman delivered the assist to the winning goal by Jaromír Šimr. In the European campaign of the following season, NEC were knocked out of contention by Wisła Kraków. Schuurman made a total of 100 league appearances for the club during a three-year spell.

Schuurman later moved to Twente in a player swap with Patrick Pothuizen. He would also appear for De Graafschap. In July 2009, Schuurman signed a two-year contract with Heracles Almelo after his former team De Graafschap relegated to the Eerste Divisie. He then returned to Go Ahead Eagles. He was released after his contract had expired in July 2013. He subsequently retired from football.

Managerial career
After retiring as a player, Schuurman began coaching various teams in the youth academy of Go Ahead Eagles. In January 2019, he was appointed head coach of Derde Klasse club VV Activia in Twello. At that point, he was the assistant to Uğur Yıldırım at Go Ahead Eagles U17. 

On 8 January 2021, it was announced that Schuurman would become the manager of Vierde Klasse club DVV Davo from the beginning of the 2021–22 season.

International career
Schuurman was born in the Netherlands to a Turkish father and Dutch mother. He was a youth international for the Netherlands.

References

1979 births
Living people
Footballers from Deventer
Dutch footballers
Netherlands youth international footballers
Dutch people of Turkish descent
Go Ahead Eagles players
NEC Nijmegen players
FC Twente players
De Graafschap players
Heracles Almelo players
Eredivisie players
Eerste Divisie players
Association football midfielders
Netherlands under-21 international footballers
Dutch football managers
Go Ahead Eagles non-playing staff